Hollis Price (born October 29, 1979) is an American former professional basketball player. He is currently an assistant coach for the University of Houston men's basketball program.

College career 
Price played college basketball at the University of Oklahoma from 1999 to 2003. He helped to lead the Sooners to the Final Four in 2002.  He is widely regarded as one of the best basketball players to come out of the University of Oklahoma since Wayman Tisdale.

Professional career 
He previously played for BC Lietuvos Rytas of Lithuania's LKL, ALBA Berlin of Germany, Le Mans Sarthe Basket of France, and CB Sevilla of ACB. In the Euroleague 2007-2008, Price was the top scorer of the BC Lietuvos Rytas and its main play maker. Price was the first player signed by Dynamo Moscow following the hiring of coach David Blatt.

He joined Olimpia Milano in 2009. In February 2010 Price moved to Artland Dragons. On August 3, 2010 he returned to ALBA Berlin by signing a one-year contract, but was released in February 2011.

On May 1, 2014, Price was hired as director of player development for the University of Houston men's basketball program.

EuroLeague career statistics

|-
| style="text-align:left;"| 2007–08
| style="text-align:left;"| Lietuvos Rytas
| 20 || 20 || 33.4 || .523 || .438 || .873 || 2.2 || 3.9 || 1.0 || .0 || 16.9 || 14.1
|-
| style="text-align:left;"| 2009–10
| style="text-align:left;"| Milano
| 6 || 4 || 29.0 || .444 || .364 || .833 || 2.3 || 1.8 || .7 || .0 || 9.5 || 6.0

References

External links 
 Eurocup Player Profile
 Player Profile @ ACB.com
 Basketpedya.com Player Profile
 Player Profile & SoonerSports.com

1979 births
Living people
African-American basketball players
Alba Berlin players
All-American college men's basketball players
American expatriate basketball people in France
American expatriate basketball people in Germany
American expatriate basketball people in Italy
American expatriate basketball people in Lithuania
American expatriate basketball people in Russia
American expatriate basketball people in Spain
American men's basketball players
Artland Dragons players
Basketball players from New Orleans
BC Dynamo Moscow players
BC Rytas players
Real Betis Baloncesto players
Le Mans Sarthe Basket players
Liga ACB players
Oklahoma Sooners men's basketball players
Houston Cougars men's basketball coaches
Olimpia Milano players
Point guards
21st-century African-American sportspeople
20th-century African-American sportspeople